The Occupation of Poti was a series of Russian strikes against the Georgian port of Poti during the Russo-Georgian War in August 2008. The city was later occupied by Russian troops, who remained for some time before eventually withdrawing.

Background
Poti is the economically vital port of Georgia on the Black Sea. Poti is a critical entry point for the South Caucasus and the land-locked nations of Central Asia.

Occupation

Russian aircraft bombed Poti on 8 August, and the port was closed for two days. The Russian air force attacked the port on 9 August.

Russian warships were deployed near Georgian ports along the Black Sea coast, including Poti, on 10 August 2008. It was reported that Russia had dropped fragmentation bombs in Poti.

On 11 August, Georgian officials said that Russian forces had entered Poti, though Russia claimed they had only sent in a reconnaissance mission. In the morning of 12 August, bombing was heard an hour after Russian president had announced he would cease Russian military campaign. Russian troops drove through the port of Poti, and took up positions around it.

On 12 August, combat swimmers of the Russian Black Sea Fleet conducted a successful raid on Poti harbour, destroying Georgian torpedo and missile boats.

On 13 August, Al Jazeera correspondents in Poti reported "more and more Russian troops coming into the area all day" and the destruction of six Georgian vessels. Reporter Hoda Abdel Hamid said that "Russia is clearly on the offensive."

On 14 August, Reuters reported that witnesses in Poti said that Russian tanks had entered the town and were "looting". Russia's deputy chief of the general staff, Anatoliy Nogovitsyn denied the presence of Russian troops in Poti. An Associated Press Television News crew witnessed Russian troops on the outskirts of Poti as they searched an old Soviet military base for Georgian military equipment. On 15 August, BBC reporter said that Russian forces aimed to remove or destroy military equipment in Poti.

From 13 to 15 August, according to Moscow Defence Brief, "Russian paratroops raided Poti again and again, destroying almost all of the docked ships and boats of the Georgian Navy, and took away a quantity of valuable military equipment."

On the morning of 19 August, some 70 Russian troops entered the port grounds. Russian forces in Poti took prisoner 21 Georgian soldiers that were guarding the port. Russians also seized 5 Humvees that were the United States property. They were taken to a Georgian military base occupied by Russian troops at Senaki. Humvees then reportedly were taken to Abkhazia, deep in Russian-held territory. Russian soldiers had deployed artillery along major highways between Abkhazia and Poti. The captured servicemen were members of the Georgian coast guard, who had returned to their previously abandoned positions in Poti on the late night of 18 August. According to Georgian officials, they had a right to do so under the ceasefire agreement. Officials from Poti followed the Russians to Senaki to negotiate the soldiers' release. The Wall Street Journal said Russian actions in Poti was another blow to Georgia's economy. An Azerbaijani news source quoted a Poti port official as saying, "All workers were expelled from the port".

On 20 August, an official from the Poti port said that the Russian military had withdrawn.

On 22 August, Russia declared the withdrawal of its forces was completed from Georgia. Yet, two Russian outposts remained outside Poti for patrolling. On 23 August, at a news conference General Anatoly Nogovitsyn insisted that "These patrols were envisaged in the international agreement" and "Poti is outside of the security zone, but that does not mean we will sit behind a fence watching them riding around in Hummers."

On 13 September, all posts near Poti were abandoned by 11:00 MSK.

Aftermath
The UNOSAT carried out the initial analysis of satellite pictures of Poti acquired on 25 August 2008. Six submerged Georgian vessels were identified, while no other damage was visible in the city.

References

Russo-Georgian War
Poti
Poti
Poti
Military occupation
Poti
August 2008 events in Asia
September 2008 events in Asia
Poti